The Queen of Scotland (Child ballad 301, Roud number 3878) is a folk song.

Synopsis
The Queen of Scotland tries to lure Troy Muir to her bed.  When she fails, she directs him to lift a stone in her garden, and a hungry snake emerges.  A woman cut off her breast to appease the beast, and the wound healed within an hour.  Troy marries her.  Nine months later, she bears a son, and her breast was restored.

See also
 List of the Child Ballads

External links
The Queen of Scotland
Roud entry

Child Ballads
Year of song unknown